Hoseynabad (also Romanized as Ḩoseynābād) is a village in Qara Bashlu Rural District, Chapeshlu District, Dargaz County, Razavi Khorasan Province, Iran. At the 2006 census, its population was 40, in 8 families.

References 

Populated places in Dargaz County